Frank Baker (October 11, 1892 – December 30, 1980) was an Australian-American actor and stuntman most noted for his appearances in A Chump at Oxford, The New Adventures of Tarzan, and Mary of Scotland.

He was a member of the informal John Ford Stock Company, appearing in 17 of Ford's films.

He also performed on television, in an uncredited role as a Townsman on Gene Barry's TV Western Bat Masterson in the 1960 episode "Six Feet of Gold".

Partial filmography
 Cameo Kirby (1923)
 The Diamond Bandit (1924)
 The Fighting Heart (1925)
 Red Blood and Blue (1925)
 Scar Hanan (1925)
 Tentacles of the North (1926)
 The Gallant Fool (1926)
 A Million for Love (1928)
 The New Adventures of Tarzan (1935)
 Mary of Scotland (1936)
Tundra (1936)
 London by Night (1937)
 Escape to Glory (1940)
 A Chump at Oxford (1940)
 The Blonde from Singapore (1941)
 Donovan's Reef (1963)
 Bedknobs and Broomsticks (1971)

References

External links

1892 births
1980 deaths
Australian male silent film actors
Male actors from Melbourne
20th-century Australian male actors
Male Western (genre) film actors
Australian emigrants to the United States